Different Worlds was an American role-playing games magazine published from 1979 to 1987.

Scope

Different Worlds published support articles, scenarios, and variants for various role-playing games including Dungeons & Dragons, RuneQuest, Traveller, Call of Cthulhu and others; play techniques and strategies for players and gamemasters of role-playing games; reviews of games and miniatures; and reviews of current books and movies of interest to role-playing gamers.

Notably, Different Worlds also featured early works by artists Steve Oliff, Bill Willingham, and Steve Purcell; ″Sword of Hollywood″, a regular film review column by Larry DiTillio from issue seven onward; the irregular autobiographical/interview feature ″My Life and Roleplaying″; and the industry scuttlebutt column ″A Letter from Gigi″ by the pseudonymous Gigi D'Arn.

Publication history
Different Worlds was launched in 1979 by Tadashi Ehara and Greg Stafford of Chaosium as a general-interest role-playing magazine. At that time Chaosium was primarily a board games publisher, but had also published its own role-playing game, RuneQuest, in 1978. RuneQuest was designed primarily to be played in Glorantha, Stafford's fantasy world and the setting of the board games White Bear and Red Moon (later Dragon Pass) and Nomad Gods.

Chaosium had previously published the magazine Wyrm's Footnotes, which ran for fourteen issues from 1976 to 1982. Wyrm's Footnotes was conceived primarily as support for White Bear and Red Moon and other Chaosium board games, but quickly became a forum for discussion of Glorantha, and was rebranded to be the official RuneQuest magazine with its 11th issue (Spring 1981).

Different Worlds was published bimonthly from 1979 to 1987, for forty-seven issues. Chaosium published the first thirty-eight issues from 1979 to 1985, and Sleuth Publications published the final nine issues between 1985 and 1987. Tadashi Ehara was the magazine's editor at both publishers.

Notes

1979 establishments in California
1987 disestablishments in California
Defunct magazines published in the United States
Magazines established in 1979
Magazines disestablished in 1987
Magazines published in the San Francisco Bay Area
Role-playing game magazines
Wargaming magazines